Garmuk (also Romanized as Garmūk) is a village in Hana Rural District, in the Central District of Semirom County, Isfahan Province, Iran. At the 2006 census, its population was 1,115, in 221 families.

References 

Populated places in Semirom County